When You're Young, the World Belongs to You (German: Wenn du jung bist, gehört dir die Welt) is a 1934 Austrian comedy film directed by Richard Oswald and starring Joseph Schmidt, Otto Treßler and Lilliane Dietz. Along with Adventures on the Lido, it was denied a permit to be shown in German cinemas because Oswald was deemed an enemy of National Socialism.

Cast
Joseph Schmidt as Carlo 
Otto Treßler as Rossani 
Lilliane Dietz as Lisetta 
Ernst Arndt as village organist 
Walter Edthofer as Roberto 
Frida Richard as Theresa 
S. Z. Sakall as Beppo
Gerd Oswald as Giuseppe, horse boy
Artuir Preuß as Tenor 
Richard Eybner as Theater director

References

External links

1934 films
1934 comedy films
Austrian comedy films
Films directed by Richard Oswald
Austrian black-and-white films